Ulung Sitepu was an Indonesian general and politician who served as the governor of North Sumatra from 1963 until 1965. Following the 30 September Movement, he was arrested and accused of supporting the movement. He was sentenced to death, but the sentence was later reduced to life imprisonment.

Member of the Provisional People's Consultative Assembly 
Sitepu was inaugurated as a member of the Provisional People's Consultative Assembly, representing the Functional Groups, on 15 September 1960. He held the office until his election as the Governor of North Sumatra.

Governor of North Sumatra 
Sitepu's nomination as the Governor of North Sumatra was supported by the Indonesian Communist Party faction in North Sumatra. He was inaugurated as Governor on 15 July 1963.

During his tenure as the governor, Sitepu fully supported the inaugural Games of the New Emerging Forces, held in Jakarta. He began raising funds in North Sumatra and managed to raise 50 million rupiahs for the games. Aside from the financial donation, he also donated 2400 bottles of passion fruit drinks and dozens of ulos for the games.

Protests 
Sitepu faced protests from a group of demonstrators under the command of Yan Paruhum Lubis. The demonstrators accused Sitepu of appropriating funds for the construction of a public toilet in North Sumatra's central market. Sitepu ordered the arrest of Lubis, who was detained for one week. Lubis was released due to the help of Kosen Cokrosentono, a military lecturer.

Arrest and imprisonment 
Following the 30 September Movement, Sitepu expressed his support for the movement by congratulating its leader, Untung Syamsuri, and pledging his allegiance to the movement. After the crackdown against the movement, Sitepu fled Medan, the capital of North Sumatra, on 8 September 1965 to Kabanjahe in Karo.  He was arrested and was brought to Jakarta on 4 November 1965. He was brought back to Medan to be tried by an Extraordinary Military Court in September 1966. The court sentenced him to death; in 1980 the sentence was commuted by President Suharto to life imprisonment. Sitepu was incarcerated in the Tanjung Gusta Prison in Medan.

Doubts as a communist 
Researchers from the University of North Sumatra cast doubt on the accusation of Sitepu being a communist. The researchers pointed out that there is no conclusion whether Sitepu was arrested because he gave political advantages to members of the Indonesian Communist Party or because he was trusted by Sukarno.

References

Bibliography 

1917 births
Karo people
Governors of North Sumatra
Indonesian Christians
Year of death missing